The Democratic Party was a political party in Georgia.

History
The Democratic Party first contested national elections in 1992, when it received 7% of the votes and won ten seats in Parliament. In the 1995 elections the party's vote share dropped to 1.9% and it lost parliamentary representation.

References

Defunct political parties in Georgia (country)